Athletes from Spain competed at the 1992 Winter Paralympics, which were held in Albertville, France, and won four medals, one silver and three bronze.

References

Nations at the 1992 Winter Paralympics
1992
1992 in Spanish sport